Te Waikoropupū Springs, also known as Pupu Springs and Waikaremumu Springs, are located in Golden Bay, in New Zealand's South Island. The springs are known for the clarity of the water, and the volume of water discharged. The springs are spiritually significant to Māori people. The springs feed Te Waikoropupū River, a short tributary of the Tākaka River.

Water clarity 
The horizontal visibility of the constantly 11.7 °C cool water in the springs has been measured at an average of 63 metres, and until 2011 was considered second only to sub-glacial water in the Antarctic. Since that year, however, the record holder for fresh water clarity is Blue Lake, also in Tasman District.

Volume of water 

The springs are notable for the volume of water discharged from the eight main vents. It is estimated that 14,000 litres of water are produced per second, approximately enough to fill 40 bathtubs. In a 1974 television documentary, it was noted that this would be enough water to supply a city the size of Boston, Massachusetts.  The floor of the lake is covered with white sand.  Waters expelled from some of the smaller vents carry the sand upward.  These vents are known as the 'dancing sands', which for the few scuba divers who have secured permission to dive in the springs, is one of the highlights of underwater sightseeing.

Spiritual significance 

The Springs have been registered as Wahi Tapu with the Māori Heritage Council of Heritage New Zealand.
Waikoropupū is the legendary home of the female taniwha, Huriawa, one of the three main taniwha of Aotearoa. She is a diver of land and sea, travelling deep beneath the earth to clear blocked waterways. She is brave and wise and believed to still rest in the waters of Waikoropupū, when she is not away attending to business.

At the entrance to the walkway to the springs, the Department of Conservation has placed a sign:

"Te Waikoropupu Springs are a taonga (treasure) and waahi tapu (a sacred place) for Māori, both locally and nationally. The legends of Te Waikoropupu are told in the stories of Huriawa, its taniwha (guardian spirit). In Māori tradition the Springs are waiora, the purest form of water which is the wairua (spiritual) and the physical source of life. The Springs provide water for healing, and in the past were a place of ceremonial blessings at times of birth and death and the leaving and returning of travellers."

References

Landforms of the Tasman District
Springs of New Zealand
Karst springs
Golden Bay